This list of airports in the United Kingdom is a partial list of public active aerodromes (airports and airfields) in the UK and the British Crown Dependencies. Most private airfields are not listed. For a list ranked by volume of traffic, see Busiest airports in the United Kingdom by total passenger traffic.

The ICAO codes for airports in the United Kingdom (and its Crown Dependencies) begin with the two letters "EG". RAF Mount Pleasant on the Falkland Islands also uses the "EG" code.

Airport names in italics are listed in the UK Aeronautical Information Publication. Airport names in bold have scheduled commercial airline service(s). Runway information is for the longest runway when more than one is available.

Airports in England

Airports in Northern Ireland

Airports in Scotland

Airports in Wales

Airports in the British Crown Dependencies

See also
 Aviation in the United Kingdom
 List of air stations of the Royal Navy
 List of Royal Air Force stations
 List of airports by ICAO code: E#EG - United Kingdom (and British Crown dependencies)
 Wikipedia:WikiProject Aviation/Airline destination lists: Europe#United Kingdom

Airports in British overseas territories
{
  "type": "FeatureCollection",
  "features": [
    {
      "type": "Feature",
      "properties": {
        "marker-color": "#1a00ff",
        "marker-size": "medium",
        "marker-symbol": "airport"
      },
      "geometry": {
        "type": "Point",
        "coordinates": [
          -63.05336952209473,
          18.204974250936235
        ]
      }
    },
    {
      "type": "Feature",
      "properties": {
        "marker-color": "#001cff",
        "marker-size": "medium",
        "marker-symbol": "airport"
      },
      "geometry": {
        "type": "Point",
        "coordinates": [
          -64.68059062957764,
          32.364629517132904
        ]
      }
    },
    {
      "type": "Feature",
      "properties": {
        "marker-color": "#0300ff",
        "marker-size": "medium",
        "marker-symbol": "airport"
      },
      "geometry": {
        "type": "Point",
        "coordinates": [
          72.41080284118652,
          -7.313305589859519
        ]
      }
    },
    {
      "type": "Feature",
      "properties": {
        "marker-color": "#0043ff",
        "marker-size": "medium",
        "marker-symbol": "airport"
      },
      "geometry": {
        "type": "Point",
        "coordinates": [
          -64.54094409942626,
          18.445496986587326
        ]
      }
    },
    {
      "type": "Feature",
      "properties": {
        "marker-color": "#2900ff",
        "marker-size": "medium",
        "marker-symbol": "airfield"
      },
      "geometry": {
        "type": "Point",
        "coordinates": [
          -64.3294358253479,
          18.727429205343714
        ]
      }
    },
    {
      "type": "Feature",
      "properties": {
        "marker-color": "#0300ff",
        "marker-size": "medium",
        "marker-symbol": "airport"
      },
      "geometry": {
        "type": "Point",
        "coordinates": [
          -64.42803382873535,
          18.445995690360512
        ]
      }
    },
    {
      "type": "Feature",
      "properties": {
        "marker-color": "#2100ff",
        "marker-size": "medium",
        "marker-symbol": "airport"
      },
      "geometry": {
        "type": "Point",
        "coordinates": [
          -81.35663509368896,
          19.293079008211883
        ]
      }
    },
    {
      "type": "Feature",
      "properties": {
        "marker-color": "#000dff",
        "marker-size": "medium",
        "marker-symbol": "airfield"
      },
      "geometry": {
        "type": "Point",
        "coordinates": [
          -80.09997725486755,
          19.666806197629924
        ]
      }
    },
    {
      "type": "Feature",
      "properties": {
        "marker-color": "#1a00ff",
        "marker-size": "medium",
        "marker-symbol": "airport"
      },
      "geometry": {
        "type": "Point",
        "coordinates": [
          -79.87963914871216,
          19.687354334815254
        ]
      }
    },
    {
      "type": "Feature",
      "properties": {
        "marker-color": "#0300ff",
        "marker-size": "medium",
        "marker-symbol": "airfield"
      },
      "geometry": {
        "type": "Point",
        "coordinates": [
          -57.77885913848877,
          -51.685820364059026
        ]
      }
    },
    {
      "type": "Feature",
      "properties": {
        "marker-color": "#0024ff",
        "marker-size": "medium",
        "marker-symbol": "airport"
      },
      "geometry": {
        "type": "Point",
        "coordinates": [
          -58.45009803771972,
          -51.82134933886299
        ]
      }
    },
    {
      "type": "Feature",
      "properties": {
        "marker-color": "#003bff",
        "marker-size": "medium",
        "marker-symbol": "airport"
      },
      "geometry": {
        "type": "Point",
        "coordinates": [
          -5.347187519073486,
          36.15145965125832
        ]
      }
    },
    {
      "type": "Feature",
      "properties": {
        "marker-color": "#0a00ff",
        "marker-size": "medium",
        "marker-symbol": "airport"
      },
      "geometry": {
        "type": "Point",
        "coordinates": [
          -62.193721532821655,
          16.791353067416125
        ]
      }
    },
    {
      "type": "Feature",
      "properties": {
        "marker-color": "#0015ff",
        "marker-size": "medium",
        "marker-symbol": "airport"
      },
      "geometry": {
        "type": "Point",
        "coordinates": [
          -5.645942687988281,
          -15.960813320294688
        ]
      }
    },
    {
      "type": "Feature",
      "properties": {
        "marker-color": "#0033ff",
        "marker-size": "medium",
        "marker-symbol": "airport"
      },
      "geometry": {
        "type": "Point",
        "coordinates": [
          -14.39082384109497,
          -7.971198949344218
        ]
      }
    },
    {
      "type": "Feature",
      "properties": {
        "marker-color": "#003bff",
        "marker-size": "medium",
        "marker-symbol": "airport"
      },
      "geometry": {
        "type": "Point",
        "coordinates": [
          -71.14265441894531,
          21.444560726087573
        ]
      }
    },
    {
      "type": "Feature",
      "properties": {
        "marker-color": "#001cff",
        "marker-size": "medium",
        "marker-symbol": "airfield"
      },
      "geometry": {
        "type": "Point",
        "coordinates": [
          -71.80331468582153,
          21.826185821364337
        ]
      }
    },
    {
      "type": "Feature",
      "properties": {
        "marker-color": "#0024ff",
        "marker-size": "medium",
        "marker-symbol": "airport"
      },
      "geometry": {
        "type": "Point",
        "coordinates": [
          -71.93946361541748,
          21.91734819775826
        ]
      }
    },
    {
      "type": "Feature",
      "properties": {
        "marker-color": "#0052ff",
        "marker-size": "medium",
        "marker-symbol": "airfield"
      },
      "geometry": {
        "type": "Point",
        "coordinates": [
          -72.09166288375854,
          21.87480105391674
        ]
      }
    },
    {
      "type": "Feature",
      "properties": {
        "marker-color": "#003bff",
        "marker-size": "medium",
        "marker-symbol": "airfield"
      },
      "geometry": {
        "type": "Point",
        "coordinates": [
          -71.64130926132202,
          21.300030435880785
        ]
      }
    },
    {
      "type": "Feature",
      "properties": {
        "marker-color": "#002cff",
        "marker-size": "medium",
        "marker-symbol": "airport"
      },
      "geometry": {
        "type": "Point",
        "coordinates": [
          -72.27107048034668,
          21.773768022309604
        ]
      }
    },
    {
      "type": "Feature",
      "properties": {
        "marker-color": "#0024ff",
        "marker-size": "medium",
        "marker-symbol": "airfield"
      },
      "geometry": {
        "type": "Point",
        "coordinates": [
          -71.19970500469208,
          21.334492463745327
        ]
      }
    },
    {
      "type": "Feature",
      "properties": {
        "marker-color": "#0024ff",
        "marker-size": "medium",
        "marker-symbol": "airport"
      },
      "geometry": {
        "type": "Point",
        "coordinates": [
          -71.52809858322144,
          21.515664359463276
        ]
      }
    },
    {
      "type": "Feature",
      "properties": {
        "marker-color": "#0015ff",
        "marker-size": "medium",
        "marker-symbol": "airfield"
      },
      "geometry": {
        "type": "Point",
        "coordinates": [
          -68.12570571899414,
          -67.5662942707537
        ]
      }
    }
  ]
}

 List of airports in Anguilla
 List of airports in Bermuda
 List of airports in the British Indian Ocean Territory
 List of airports in the British Virgin Islands
 List of airports in the Cayman Islands
 List of airports in the Falkland Islands
 List of airports in Gibraltar
 List of airports in Montserrat
 List of airports in Saint Helena
 List of airports in the Turks and Caicos Islands

Footnotes

References

External links
 World Aero Data - Airports in United Kingdom 

 
United Kingdom
Airports in the United Kingdom